English state-funded schools, commonly known as state schools, provide education to pupils between the ages of 3 and 18 without charge. Approximately 93% of English schoolchildren attend 20,000 or so such schools. Since 2008 about 75% have attained "academy status", which essentially gives them a higher budget per pupil from the Department for Education.

There are a number of categories of English state-funded schools including academy schools, community schools, faith schools, foundation schools, free schools (including studio schools, maths schools and university technical colleges), and a small number of state boarding schools and City Technology Colleges. About one third of English state-funded schools are faith schools; i.e. affiliated with religious groups, most often from the Church of England (approximately 2/3 of faith schools), or the Roman Catholic Church (around 3/10). There are also schools affiliated to other Christian churches; in 2011, there were 42 Jewish, 12 Muslim, 3 Sikh and 1 Hindu faith schools. These faith schools include sub-categories such as faith-academy schools, voluntary aided schools, and voluntary controlled schools: most voluntary controlled schools are faith schools.

All of these are funded through national and local taxation. A number of state-funded secondary schools are specialist schools, receiving extra funding to develop one or more subjects in which the school specialises, such as Cirencester Deer Park School which currently has 5 specialisms. State schools may request payment from parents for extracurricular activities such as swimming lessons and field trips, provided these charges are voluntary.

History

Until 1870 all schools were charitable or private institutions, but in that year the Elementary Education Act 1870 permitted local governments to complement the existing elementary schools, to fill up any gaps. The Education Act 1902 allowed local authorities to create secondary schools. The Education Act 1918 abolished fees for elementary schools.

This table gives a simplified overview of how the compulsory provision of education by the state (yellow) and compulsory education (purple) developed since 1870, and also how the types of schools used for this purpose evolved. Use some caution with this table which gives a simplified view based on changing policies and legislation, the reality on the ground changed more slowly and is more complex.

Types of state school

Since 1998, there have been six main types of maintained school in England:
 Academy schools, established by the 1997–2010 Labour Government to replace poorly performing community schools in areas of high social and economic deprivation. Their start-up costs are typically funded by private means, such as entrepreneurs or NGOs, with running costs met by Central Government and, like Foundation schools, are administratively free from direct local authority control. The 2010 Conservative-Liberal Democrat coalition government expanded the role of Academies in the Academy Programme, in which a wide number of schools in non-deprived areas were also encouraged to become Academies, thereby essentially replacing the role of Foundation schools established by the previous Labour government. They are monitored directly by the Department for Education.
 Free schools, introduced by the Conservative-Liberal Democrat coalition following the 2010 general election, are newly established schools in England set up by parents, teachers, charities or businesses, where there is a perceived local need for more schools. They are funded by taxpayers, are academically non-selective and free to attend, and like Foundation schools and Academies, are not controlled by a local authority. They are ultimately accountable to the Secretary of State for Education, and are conceptually based on similar schools found in Sweden, Chile, New Zealand, Canada and the United States, where they are known as Charter schools. Free schools are an extension of the existing Academy Programme, and are in fact legally identical to Academies with the term "Free School" being used for Academies that are newly established under the Governments Free School Initiative rather than being an existing school converted to Academy status. The Academies Act 2010 authorises the creation of free schools and allows all existing state schools to become Academy schools. Persons or groups seeking to set up a Free School may obtain assistance from the government supported New Schools Network. The first 24 free schools opened in Autumn 2011.
 Community schools or county schools, in which the local authority employs the schools' staff, owns the schools' lands and buildings, and has primary responsibility for admissions.
 Foundation schools, in which the governing body employs the staff and has primary responsibility for admissions. School land and buildings are owned by the governing body or by a charitable foundation. The Foundation appoints a minority of governors. Many of these schools were formerly grant maintained schools. In 2005 the Labour government proposed allowing all schools to become Foundation schools if they wished.
 Voluntary aided schools, linked to a variety of organisations. They can be faith schools (about two thirds are Church of England-affiliated; Roman Catholic Church, which are just under one third; or another faith), or non-denominational schools, such as those linked to London Livery Companies. The charitable foundation contributes towards the capital costs of the school, and appoints a majority of the school governors. The governing body employs the staff and has primary responsibility for admissions.
 Voluntary controlled schools, which are almost always faith schools, with the lands and buildings often owned by a charitable foundation. However, the local authority employs the schools' staff and has primary responsibility for admissions.

In addition, 3 of the 15 City Technology Colleges established in the 1980s still remain, the rest having converted to academies. These are state-funded all-ability secondary schools which charge no fees but which are independent of local authority control.

There is also a small number of state-funded boarding schools, such as Gordons, which typically charge for board but not tuition. Boarding fees are limited to £12,000 per annum .

All schools are regularly inspected by the Office for Standards in Education, often known simply as Ofsted. Ofsted publish reports on the quality of education, learning outcomes, management, and safety and behaviour of young people at a particular school on a regular basis. School inspection reports are published online and directly sent to parents and guardians.

School years 

Children are normally placed in year groups determined by the age they will attain at their birthday during the school year. In most cases progression from one year group to another is based purely on chronological age, although it is possible in some circumstances for a student to repeat or skip a year. Repetition may be due to a lack of attendance, for example from a long illness, and especially in Years requiring standard tests. A child significantly more advanced than their classmates may be forwarded one or more years.

State-funded nursery education is available from the age of 3, and may be full-time or part-time, though this is not compulsory.
If registered with a state school, attendance is compulsory beginning with the term following the child's fifth birthday. Children can be enrolled in the reception year in September of that school year, thus beginning school at age 4 or 4.5. Unless the student chooses to stay within the education system, compulsory school attendance ends on the last Friday in June during the academic year in which a student attains the age of 16.

In the vast majority of cases, pupils progress from primary to secondary levels at age 11; in some areas either or both of the primary and secondary levels are further subdivided. A few areas have three-tier education systems with an intermediate middle level from age 9 to 13.

Years 12 and 13 are often referred to as "lower sixth form" and "upper sixth form" respectively, reflecting their distinct, voluntary nature as the A-level years. While most secondary schools enter their pupils for A-levels, some state schools have joined the independent sector in offering the International Baccalaureate or Cambridge Pre-U qualifications instead.

Some independent schools still refer to Years 7 to 11 as "first form" to "fifth form", reflecting earlier usage.
Historically, this arose from the system in public schools, where all forms were divided into Lower, Upper, and sometimes Middle sections. Year 7 is equivalent to "Upper Third Form", Year 8 would have been known as "Lower Fourth", and so on. Some independent schools still employ this method of labelling Year groups.

The table below describes the most common patterns for schooling in the state sector in England.

Curriculum

All maintained schools in England are required to follow the National Curriculum, which is made up of twelve subjects.

Under the National Curriculum, all pupils undergo National Curriculum Tests towards the end of Key Stage 2 at Year 6 in the core subjects of Literacy, Numeracy and Science, but not in the foundation subjects such as Geography, History, Art & Design, Design & Technology and Information & Communication Technology where individual teacher assessment is used instead. Pupils normally take GCSE exams in the last two years of Key Stage 4 at Year 11, but may also choose to work towards the attainment of alternative qualifications.

The core subjects—English, Mathematics and Science—are compulsory for all students aged 5 to 16. A range of other subjects, known as foundation subjects, are compulsory in each Key Stages:
 Art & Design
 Citizenship
 Design & Technology
 Geography
 History
 Information & Communication Technology
 Modern Foreign Languages
 Music
 Physical Education

In addition to the compulsory subjects, students at Key Stage 4 have a statutory entitlement to be able to study at least one subject from the arts (comprising art and design, music, photography, dance, drama and media arts), design and technology (comprising design and technology, electronics, engineering, food preparation and nutrition), the humanities (comprising geography and history), business and enterprise (comprising business studies and economics) and one modern language.

Other subjects with a non-statutory programme of study in the National Curriculum are also taught, including Religious education in all Key Stages, Sex education from Key Stage 2, and Career education and Work-related learning in Key Stages 3 and 4.
Religious education within schools may be withdrawn for individual pupils with parental consent. Similarly, parents of children in schools may choose to opt their child out of some or all sex education lessons.

Discipline
There is concern that some types of discipline are harsh and can harm pupils. Prolonged periods of isolation are criticised as are excessive suspensions. There is concern that schools, especially academies are choosing punishments that cost less to administer.

Inspections
All state-funded schools are regularly inspected by the Office for Standards in Education, often known simply as Ofsted. Ofsted publish reports on the quality of education at a particular school on a regular basis. Schools judged by Ofsted to be providing an inadequate standard of education may be subject to special measures, which could include replacing the governing body and senior staff.

Test and inspection results for schools are published, and are an important measure of their performance.

Selection and attainment
English secondary schools are mostly comprehensive, except in a few areas that retain a form of the previous selective system (with students selected for grammar school by the Eleven-Plus exam).
There are also a number of isolated fully selective grammar schools, and a few dozen partially selective schools. Specialist schools may also select up to 10% of their intake for aptitude in their specialism (performing arts, art and design, humanities, languages, business studies, science, technology, etc). They are not permitted to select on academic ability generally.

The intake of comprehensive schools can vary widely, especially in urban areas with several local schools.

Sir Peter Newsam, Chief Schools Adjudicator 1999–2002, has argued that English schools can be divided into 8 types (with some overlap), based on the ability range of their intake:

 "Super-Selective": almost all of the intake from the top 10%. These are the few highly selective state grammar schools where there is no other grammar provision close by and consequently intense competition for entry, and which also select from a wide radius (sometimes as much as 30 miles). Examples include Reading School, and such schools dominate school performance tables.
 "Selective": almost all of the intake from the top 25%. These include grammar schools in areas where the Tripartite system survives, such as Buckinghamshire, Kent and Lincolnshire.
 "Comprehensive (plus)": admit children of all abilities, but concentrated in the top 50%. These include partially selective schools and a few high-status faith schools in areas without selection, and are usually in areas with expensive property prices that lead to a predominance of pupils from the higher social classes.
 "Comprehensive": intake with an ability distribution matching the local population. These schools are most common in rural areas and small towns with no nearby selection, but a few occur in urban areas.
 "Comprehensive (minus)": admit children of all abilities, but with few in the top 25%. These include comprehensive schools with nearby selective schools "skimming" the intake.
 Secondary Modern: hardly any of the intake in the top 25%, but an even distribution of the rest. These include non-selective schools in areas where the Tripartite system survives, such as Buckinghamshire, Kent and Lincolnshire. Such schools are little different to "comprehensive minus" in practice.
 "Comprehensive (Secondary Modern (minus)": no pupils in the top 25% and 10–15% in the next 25%. These schools are most common in urban areas where alternatives of types 1–5 are available.
 "Comprehensive (Sub-Secondary Modern)": intake heavily weighted toward the low end of the ability range and tend to be in areas of considerable social deprivation.
This ranking is reflected in performance tables, and thus the schools' attractiveness to parents. Thus, although schools may use the phrase "Comprehensive" in their prospectus or name, the schools at the higher end of the spectrum are not comprehensive in intake. Indeed, the variation in the social groupings in school intake, and the differences in academic performance, are enormous, and there are wider variations between supposedly mixed-ability comprehensive schools at the higher and lower end of this scale, than between some grammars and secondary moderns.

Funding
Almost all state-funded schools in England are maintained schools, which receive their funding from local authorities, and are required to follow the National Curriculum. In such schools, all teachers are employed under the nationally agreed School Teachers' Pay and Conditions Document.

Legislation
Education Act 1996 giving further rights and responsibilities to schools and pupils who attend them.
Elementary Education Act 1870 permitted local governments to complement the existing elementary schools
 Education Act 1902 abolished school boards, allowed local authorities to create secondary schools
 Education Act 1918 abolished fees for elementary schools.
 School Standards and Framework Act 1998 County schools renamed as Community schools. Foundation schools were set up, replacing Grant-maintained schools. This legislation provides parents and carers with a right of appeal against a refusal to admit their applicant child.
 Education Act 1944 Most of the direct grant schools became direct grant grammar schools.
 Education Act 1959 State contribution to capital works for voluntary aided schools was increased to 75% 
 Learning and Skills Act 2000 – City academies were legally
 Circular 10/65 1965 – Department of Education and Science (DES) requested local education authorities (LEAs) in England and Wales to begin converting their secondary schools to the Comprehensive System (advice only).
 Education Reform Act 1988 The City Technical College programme was established
 Education Act 2002
 Learning and Skills Act 2000
 Academies Act 2010
 Education Act 2011 required local authorities that need to create a new school to seek proposals for an Academy school or Free School in most cases
 Education and Adoption Bill 2015–16

See also
 Education in England
 State school

References

Education in England
Public education in the United Kingdom
Primary schools in England
Secondary schools in England
State schools in the United Kingdom